Les Démoniaques (English: The Demoniacs, also known as Curse of the Living Dead) is a 1974 erotic horror film directed by Jean Rollin, about a group of shipwrecked sailors who rape two young women, who re-emerge and make a pact with the devil to get their revenge.

Plot
At the end of the 19th century, on the north European coasts, live four shipwreckers simply nicknamed the "wreckers".

The Captain is their leader, followed by Le Bosco, Paul and the beautiful but perverted Tina.

When two young women accidentally stumble upon these wreckers, they brutally and violently rape them. The next day, the Captain thinks that he is going insane when he sees the women's dead bodies. He wrecks a tavern and gets into a fight with Le Bosco. The Captain, Tina, Le Bosco and Paul go back to the wreck to kill the women, who manage to escape. Wandering around, the women come across a clown who looks after them. The women are unable to speak, but a man tells them he can help them. They communicate via a drawing and the man realises that they want revenge. The women are the only ones who can free the devil from being imprisoned in the ruins of an old castle; by making love to each of them, he will give them the power to get their revenge. The women, now the "démoniaques", return for their revenge and kill Paul. At the beach, they are again attacked by the Captain and Le Bosco, who tie them to the wreck. The Captain goes mad and kills Tina and Le Bosco. He realises that what he has done is wrong, but is unable to save them, and the tide comes in and they all drown.

Cast
 Joëlle Cœur as Tina
 Lieva Lone as Demoniac
 Patricia Hermenier as Demoniac
 John Rico as The Captain
 Willy Braque as Le Bosco
 Paul Bisciglia as Paul
 Louise Dhour as Louise
 Ben Zimet as The Exorcist
 Mireille Dargent as The Clown
 Miletic Zivomir as The Devil
 Isabelle Copejans as The Barmaid
 Yves Colignon as The Barmaid's Lover
 Veronique Fanis as Girl in Tavern
 Monica Swinn as Girl in Tavern (credited as Monika)
 Jacqueline Priest as Girl in Tavern
 Anne Wattican as Girl in Tavern (credited as Anne Watticant)
 Jean-Pierre Bouyxou as Sailor in Tavern
 Raphaël Marongiu as Sailor with the Dracula puppet (credited as Raphale G. Marongiu)
 Sylvio Dieu as Sailor
 Gilbert Schnarbach as Sailor in Tavern
 Yann as Sailor
 Jio Berk as Sailor (uncredited)
 Burr Jerger as Satanist Priest on the Beach (uncredited)
 Jean-Jacques Renon as Travestite (uncredited)

Home media

Les Démoniaques was released on DVD in the US on 21 September 1999 by Image Entertainment, with an aspect ratio of 1.64:1.

It was released in the UK on 27 September 2004 by Redemption Films  with an aspect ratio of 1.64:1 and special features including the theatrical trailer, a stills gallery and a Rollin filmography.

It was released in Europe on 30 August 2005 by Encore as part of a three-disc set with a new aspect ratio of 1.78:1 and special features including selected scenes with commentary (in English), an interview with Braque, the short film Les Pays Loins, deleted scenes and a slide show.

See also 

 Siren - Ancient Greek
 Lorelei - German

External links 
 
 
 Blu-ray review at Diabolique Magazine

1974 horror films
1974 films
Films directed by Jean Rollin
French horror films
Erotic horror films
Fictional characters who have made pacts with devils
Rape and revenge films
1970s French-language films
1970s French films